Henry John Heinz III (October 23, 1938 – April 4, 1991) was an American businessman and politician who served as a United States senator from Pennsylvania from 1977 until his death in 1991. Heinz was previously the U.S. representative for Pennsylvania's 18th congressional district from 1971 to 1977.

Early life, education and early career
Henry John Heinz III was born on October 23, 1938, in Pittsburgh, Pennsylvania, the only child of Joan (Diehl) and H. J. "Jack" Heinz II, heir to the H. J. Heinz Company. His parents divorced in 1942. Heinz moved to San Francisco, California, with his mother and stepfather, U.S. Navy Captain Clayton Chot "Monty" McCauley. Although he was raised and primarily resided in San Francisco throughout his childhood, Heinz often spent the summer months with his father in Pittsburgh.

In 1956, Heinz graduated from Phillips Exeter Academy. He then attended and graduated from Yale University, where Theodore Stebbins was his roommate, in 1960, majoring in history, arts and letters. Heinz subsequently graduated from Harvard Business School in 1963. It was during his years at Harvard, during summer break, that he met his future wife, Teresa Simões Ferreira, who attended the University of Geneva. Upon graduating from Harvard Business School in 1963, Heinz served in the United States Air Force Reserve and was on active duty during the same year. He remained in the Air Force Reserve until 1969.

Before entering politics, Heinz served as an assistant to Pennsylvania Republican U.S. Senator Hugh Scott and played an active role as assistant campaign manager during Scott's campaign for re-election. Heinz then worked in the financial and marketing division of the H. J. Heinz Company between 1965 and 1970, after which he became a professor of business at the Carnegie Mellon University's Graduate School of Industrial Administration.

Political career

U.S. House of Representatives
In 1971, Heinz entered politics after Representative Robert Corbett, who represented Pennsylvania's 18th congressional district, died in office. After winning the Republican primary, Heinz won the special election on November 2, 1971, to fill the vacancy created by Corbett's death. Heinz was re-elected to the U.S. House of Representatives in 1972 and 1974.

U.S. Senate
Heinz opted not to run for re-election to his seat in the House of Representatives, choosing instead in 1976 to run for Pennsylvania's open United States Senate seat created by the retirement of incumbent Hugh Scott. Heinz won the election, and was subsequently re-elected in 1982 and in 1988.

In the Senate, Heinz was a moderate-to-liberal Republican. He was a member of the Committee on Banking, Housing, and Urban Affairs, the Committee on Finance, the National Commission on Social Security Reform, the National Commission on Health Care Reform, the Northeast Coalition, and the Steel Caucus. He also served as chairman of the Subcommittee on International Finance and Monetary Policies, the Special Committee on Aging, and the Republican Conference Task Force on Job Training and Education.

Heinz voted in favor of the bill establishing Martin Luther King Jr. Day as a federal holiday and the Civil Rights Restoration Act of 1987 (as well as to override President Reagan's veto). Heinz voted in favor of the Robert Bork Supreme Court nomination.

He was elected chairman of the National Republican Senatorial Committee for two terms, 1979–1981 and 1985–1987.

The New York Times noted that Heinz built a solid record in the Senate as "a persistent defender of the nation's growing elderly population and of the declining steel industry", that he was "instrumental in pushing through legislation that put the Social Security system on sounder financial footing", and "played a major role in strengthening laws regulating retirement policies, pension plans, health insurance and nursing homes", and "pushed successfully for trade laws that encourage American exports and protect American products, like steel, from foreign imports".

Death

On April 4, 1991, Heinz and six other people, including two children, were killed when a Sun Co. Aviation Department Bell 412 helicopter and a Piper Aerostar with Heinz aboard collided in mid-air above Merion Elementary School in Lower Merion Township, Pennsylvania. All aboard both aircraft, as well as two children at the school, were killed. The helicopter had been dispatched to investigate a problem with the landing gear of Heinz's plane. While moving in for a closer look, the helicopter collided with the plane, causing both aircraft to lose control and crash. The subsequent NTSB investigation attributed the cause of the crash to poor judgment by the pilots of the two aircraft involved.

Following a funeral at Heinz Chapel in Pittsburgh and a Washington, D.C. memorial service that was attended by President George H. W. Bush and Vice President Dan Quayle, Senator Heinz's remains were interred in the Heinz family mausoleum in Homewood Cemetery, located in the Point Breeze neighborhood of Pittsburgh, Pennsylvania.

Heinz's long time friend, Senator Tim Wirth of Colorado, remarked: "He really believed he could make the world a better place, such a contrast to the jaded resignation of our time. He could send the Senate leadership up a wall faster than anyone I've seen." Heinz's son André said at the services: "Dad, I am so grateful for the time we had, and I miss you and I love you."

In 1995, Teresa, Heinz's widow, married Heinz's Senate colleague and future Secretary of State and presidential nominee John Kerry.

Legacy 

The Tinicum Wildlife Preserve was renamed to the John Heinz National Wildlife Refuge at Tinicum in Heinz's honor following his death. The 1,200 acre (4.9 km2) refuge includes the largest remaining freshwater tidal marsh in Pennsylvania, as well as other habitats that are home to a variety of plants and animals native to Southeastern Pennsylvania.

Heinz was elected to the American Philosophical Society in 1991.

In 1993, his family established the Heinz Awards, which honors individual innovation in five categories. One of the Jefferson Awards for Public Service annual awards, for "Greatest Public Service by an Elected or Appointed Official", is named in his honor.

Several institutions bear his name, including:
Senator H. John Heinz III Archives at the Carnegie Mellon University Libraries
H. John Heinz III College at Carnegie Mellon University
H. John Heinz III Center for Science, Economics and the Environment
Senator John Heinz History Center
H. J. Heinz Campus of the VA Pittsburgh Healthcare System

Electoral history
1971 Special Election
John Heinz (R) 103,543
John E. Connelly (D) 49,269

See also

 List of United States Congress members who died in office (1950–99)

References

Further reading
 Heinz, H. John, III. "Foreign Takeover of U.S. Banking – a Real Danger?" Journal of the Institute for Socioeconomic Studies 4 (Autumn 1979): 1–9
 Heinz, John. U.S. Strategic Trade: An Export Control System for the 1990s. Boulder: Westview press, 1991.
 Heinz vaults to national prominence. November, 1982
 Heinz training for Oval Office, 1980

External links
 
 John Heinz Legacy
 Senator H. John Heinz III Archives
 The H. John Heinz III College
 The H. John Heinz III Center for Science, Economics and the Environment
 
 Senator John Heinz History Center

1938 births
1991 deaths
Accidental deaths in Pennsylvania
Burials at Homewood Cemetery
Carnegie Mellon University faculty
Harvard Business School alumni
Heinz family
Phillips Exeter Academy alumni
Politicians from Pittsburgh
Republican Party United States senators from Pennsylvania
Republican Party members of the United States House of Representatives from Pennsylvania
20th-century American politicians
United States Air Force airmen
Victims of aviation accidents or incidents in 1991
Victims of aviation accidents or incidents in the United States
Yale University alumni
Members of the American Philosophical Society